Wahydra graslieae is a butterfly species in the family Hesperiidae. It is known from a single holotype specimen found in the Andes Mountains in Ecuador. The specific epithet honors Emily Graslie.

Description
W. graslieae is about the size of a postage stamp.  In this obscure genus, W. graslieae is much darker than other described Wahydra species and with pointer forewings and metallic silver scales that have previously only been found in very distantly related skippers.

References

External links

 
 

Hesperiinae
Butterflies described in 2018
Butterflies of South America